Gmina Gorzyce may refer to either of the following rural administrative districts in Poland:
Gmina Gorzyce, Subcarpathian Voivodeship
Gmina Gorzyce, Silesian Voivodeship